Owned by Eastman Kodak Company, the Kodak Park Railroad is a private railroad that services Kodak Park in Rochester, New York. It is now called Rochester Switching Services, Inc.

References

Kodak
New York (state) railroads
Transportation in Rochester, New York